The Global Security Institute (GSI) is a largely private (though partly bipartisan), non-governmental international organization with a mission to  eliminate nuclear weapons through international cooperation and security. It aims to influence national laws, seeking to accomplish its mission by focusing on nuclear arms control, non-proliferation, and disarmament.

History
The Institute was founded by US Senator Alan Cranston in October 1999. He believed that nuclear weapons are "impractical, unacceptably risky, and unworthy of civilization."

Leadership
The current leadership of the Institute is as follows:
Kim Cranston – Chair of the Board, elected in 2000 after the passing of his father
Jonathan Granoff – President

Programs
The Institute currently consists of four well-defined programs:
Bipartisan Security Group  – constituencies include members of the United States Congress and their staff
Disarmament and Peace Education  – constituencies include citizens and leaders in the global community
Middle Powers Initiative  – constituencies include heads of government and diplomats, primarily in Brazil, Egypt, Ireland, Mexico, New Zealand, South Africa, and Sweden
Parliamentary Network for Nuclear Disarmament  – constituencies include legislators around the world

References

External links
Global Security Institute

Anti-nuclear organizations
Organizations_established_in_1999
1999 establishments in the United States